Víctor Alexis Osorio Alfaro (born 27 July 1984) is a Chilean former professional footballer who played as midfielder.

Honours
Coquimbo Unido
 Primera División de Chile: runner-up 2005 Apertura

References
 
 

1984 births
Living people
Chilean footballers
Association football midfielders
Chilean Primera División players
Cobreloa footballers
Cobresal footballers
Coquimbo Unido footballers